Nguyễn Công Trứ High School is a high school in Ho Chi Minh City, Vietnam. It is named after the Vietnamese General Nguyễn Công Trứ.

History
The school opened in 1986 with the name "Thông Tây Hội" which was changed to "Nguyễn Công Trứ Senior High School" in 1992. It was rebuilt with modern facilities in two periods of time, 1999–2001 and 2001–2005.

Curriculum
Classes for majors in Science subjects: Math, Physics, Chemistry, and Biology. Students are oriented towards 2 sections in preparation for entrance examinations to universities: Section A (Math, Physics, Chemistry) and Section B (Math, Chemistry, Biology).

Classes for majors in Social Subjects: Math, Literature, English, History and Geography. Students are oriented towards 2 sections in preparation for entrance examinations to universities: Section C (Literature, History, Geography); Section D (Math, Literature, foreign languages).

Facilities
Nguyen Cong Tru High School, which is located at 97 Quang Trung- ward 8th- Go Vap District- Ho Chi Minh City, has the territory of 6552 m2, :
 69 classrooms,
 2 laboratories for Physics, Chemistry
 3 Informatics rooms with over 65 computers
 2 multimedia rooms and 1 modern Lab (used for learning English)
 1 Auditorium

The Traditional Room of the school
In 1986, Thông Tây Hội senior high school was established, but it was very poor, so building a Traditional Room was out of the question (beyond the means). All the school's documentation was stored in a corner of the corridor.
Not until Thông Tây Hội senior high school began the reconstruction in 1999 was The Traditional room designed. In the event of 4th traditional celebration of the school in 2002, the Traditional Room was better-equipped under Ms. Nguyễn Kim Định's support. But then the room was used as a classroom while the school was under reconstruction within 2 periods of time (1999–2001, 2001–2005).

In October 2006, the Traditional Room was restored and best-equipped and only after 15 November 2006 was the room officially open to visitors.

Designing the Traditional Room, the teaching staff expect to raise the learning autonomy of all students through “ancestor’s good example”. Besides, the room is to store and display the school's quintessence with a view to bringing students pride and determination to maintain the school's tradition.

In the front of the altar of Nguyễn Công Trứ in the Traditional Room engraves a round embossment of four particular symbols: cloud, sky, river and mountain. [The circle symbolizes the universe containing the sky and the ground].

Awards
On 15 October 1992, it was a great honour that Thong Tay Hoi high school was named after Nguyễn Công Trứ.
 Great attention has unfailingly been paid to the quality of training for many years and the fact that the school has always been ranked in the top 10 leading schools in Graduation Examinations in Ho Chi Minh City is the result of high training productivity. 
The school's students have always picked up a lot of great prizes in many prestigious competitions such as Interprovincial Olympic 30-4 Contests, Ho Chi Minh City's contests for the gifted, etc.
In the academic year of 2005–2006, the school was awarded the certificate of merit by HCMC people's committee for the superb training.

Principals
1986-1998: Mr. Nguyễn Viết Ngoạn
1999-now: Mr. Đinh Minh Hòa

References
Nguyen Cong Tru, presented in Vietnamese
Nguyen Cong Tru festival
nguyen cong tru's poems
nguyen cong tru's poems e-library
nguyen cong tru's poems collection
books referring to Nguyen Cong Tru
Nguyen cong tru's poems online Library
articles about Nguyen cong tru, published by The VTC newspaper
articles about Nguyen cong tru, published by The TuoiTre newspaper
nguyen cong tru high school
articles about nguyen cong tru high school
nguyen cong tru's life
nguyen cong tru, published by the SGGP
stories about nguyen cong tru
nguyen cong tru high school's forum

Schools in Vietnam